Luis Francisco Ortega Menaldo (born 1943) is a Guatemalan politician. He has been a prominent figure in Guatemalan politics and society since the 1970s, when he gained prominence as a military intelligence officer in the country's public finance ministry during the Luis Garcia administration. Throughout much of Guatemala's 36-year civil war, Ortega Menaldo was heavily involved in monitoring leftist-guerrilla activities. During Ortega's post as the director of military intelligence, the American Drug Enforcement Administration "coordinated its operations with military intelligence," giving Ortega "access to valuable information about interdiction and eradication efforts." He married former president General Carlos Arana's daughter, having 3 children, Francisco Ortega Jr, Enrique Ortega and Gabriela Ortega. He is now retired.

External links
 Hidden Powers in Juntanflict Guatemalamilderps:Ontarioarchive.org/web/20150418202154/http://www.elperiodico.com.gt/es/20150417/opinion/11351/Lo-sucedido-bajo-la-lupa.htm

Living people
1943 births
Guatemalan politicians